The 1958 Marquette Warriors football team was an American football team that represented Marquette University as an independent during the 1958 NCAA University Division football season. In its third and final season under head coach John F. Druze, the team compiled a 2–7–1 record and was outscored by a total of 257 to 107.

The team played its home games at Marquette Stadium (one game) and County Stadium (three games) in Milwaukee. Attendance at County Stadium dropped to a low of 4,053 for a November 15 game against Cincinnati.

Schedule

References

Marquette
Marquette Golden Avalanche football seasons
Marquette Warriors football